William Smallwood (1732February 14, 1792) was an American planter, soldier and politician from Charles County, Maryland.  He served in the American Revolutionary War, rising to the rank of major general.  He was serving as the fourth Governor of Maryland when the state adopted the United States Constitution.

Early life
Smallwood was born in 1732 to planter Bayne Smallwood (1711–1768)  and Priscilla Heaberd Smallwood (born c. 1715). He had six siblings: Lucy Heabard Smallwood (born c. 1734), Elizabeth F. Smallwood (born c. 1736), Margaret F. Stoddert (born c. 1738, married Walter Stoddert c. 1760), Heabard Smallwood (born c. 1740), Priscilla Courts (born c. 1742, married John Courts c. 1760), and Eleanor Smallwood. His sister Eleanor and brother Hebard served with him later in the Revolutionary War.  His parents sent the boys to England, for their education at Eton.  His great-grandfather was James Smallwood, who immigrated in 1664  and became a member of the Maryland Assembly in 1692.  James' son Bayne (1685–1709) followed him later in the Assembly. Bayne (1711–1775) and his sister Hester were the great-great-grandchildren of Maryland Governor William Stone; Hester (Smallwood) Smith's daughter-in-law Sarah (Butler) Stone was the grandmother of James Butler Bonham and Milledge Luke Bonham. A first cousin of James and Milledge Bonham was Senator Matthew Butler

Smallwood served as an officer during the French and Indian War (the North American theater of the Seven Years' War).  He was elected to the Maryland provincial assembly.

American Revolution
When the American Revolutionary War began, Smallwood was appointed a colonel of the 1st Maryland Regiment in 1776. He led the regiment in the New York and New Jersey campaign, where the Marylanders served with distinction. 

For their role in the Battle of Brooklyn on August 27, 1776, when the Maryland Regiment heroically covered the hasty retreat of the routed Continental Army, General George Washington promoted Smallwood to brigadier general. More tragically, Washington bestowed upon the regiment a future state nickname — "Old Line State" — for the extreme sacrifice of the Maryland 400 to hold the line at the Old Stone House against a vastly superior force of British & Hessian troops whilst suffering massive casualties (≈70% killed). Shortly thereafter, Smallwood led what remained of his regiment to fight "alongside soldiers from Connecticut, Delaware, and New York" in the Battle of White Plains, when he was twice wounded but "prevented the destruction of the entire Continental Army". 

On December 21, 1777, Smallwood commanded 1,500 Delaware and Maryland troops at the Continental Army Encampment Site on the east side of Brandywine Creek, to prevent occupation of Wilmington by the British and to protect the flour mills on the Brandywine. He continued to serve under George Washington in the Philadelphia campaign, where his regiment again distinguished itself at Germantown.  Thereafter, he quartered at the Foulke house, also occupied by the family of Sally Wister.

In 1780 he was a part of General Horatio Gates' army that was routed at Camden, South Carolina; his brigade was among the formations that held their ground, garnering Smallwood a promotion to major general.  Smallwood's accounts of the battle and criticisms of Gates' behavior before and during the battle may have contributed to the Congressional inquiries into the debacle. Opposed to the hiring and promotion of foreigners, Smallwood objected to working under Baron von Steuben. Smallwood briefly commanded the militia forces of North Carolina in late 1780 and early 1781 before returning to Maryland, staying there for the remainder of the war. He resigned from the Continental Army in 1783 and later that year was elected to serve as the first president of the newly established Society of the Cincinnati of Maryland.

Governor
Smallwood was elected to Congress in 1784, but before he could take his seat, the Legislature chose him to succeed William Paca as Governor of Maryland. He qualified on November 26, 1785, and served the customary three terms, retiring from his gubernatorial office on November 24, 1788.  Smallwood had the misfortune of serving as governor during one of the most difficult periods in the history of the nation. Not only were the Articles of Confederation proving inoperable, but the country also found itself in the midst of an economic depression. In spite of the country's unsettled affairs, Smallwood was responsible for several major accomplishments, including convening the state's convention that ratified the United States Constitution, despite strong opposition to the proposed document in the State.

Later years
Smallwood never married.  The 1790 census shows that he held 56 slaves and a yearly tobacco crop of 3000 pounds.  When he died in 1792 his estate, known as Mattawoman, including his home the Retreat, passed to his sister Eleanor who married Colonel William Grayson of Virginia.  William Truman Stoddert, Smallwood's nephew, was orphaned at age 9 and raised by his maternal grandfather, Bayne Smallwood.  Stoddert also served in the Maryland Line and was admitted as an original member of The Society of the Cincinnati in the state of Maryland.

Legacy
Local historical signs in Calvert, Maryland, note that General Smallwood occupied the "East Nottingham Friends House" at the intersections of Calvert Road and Brick Meetinghouse Road (near the intersection of 272 and 273) about 6 miles east of Rising Sun, Maryland.
During his occupation of the building in 1778, Gen. Smallwood used the building as a hospital.  Some of the soldiers who died in the building were buried in the graveyard directly outside. 
Smallwood frequented the "Cross Keys Inn" (built in 1774), at the time a several-room inn and bar.  This building stands as a private residence at the intersection of Calvert Road and Cross Keys Road directly down the hill. His restored plantation home, Smallwood's Retreat, and burial site is located in Smallwood State Park in Marbury, Maryland. Smallwood Church Road leads from the State Park toward Old Durham Church, where he was a vestryman.

Several paintings exist of Smallwood. One hangs in the Old Senate Chamber in the Maryland State House in Annapolis, Maryland. The portrait of George Washington resigning within the Maryland State House, which hangs in the US Capitol Rotanda, features Smallwood.

Featured in the Maryland Historical Society is The William Smallwood Collection, 1776–1791, MS. 1875.

Honors
 The  Baltimore chapter of the Daughters of the American Revolution (DAR) is called the General William Smallwood Chapter (established 1907).
 The General Smallwood Middle School in Indian Head is another namesake.
 In Anne Arundel County, Maryland, a coastal fortification developed in the late 1890s was named Fort Smallwood in his honor and the location is now known as Fort Smallwood Park. The road running from Fort Smallwood Park through Pasadena, Maryland and into Baltimore City is named Fort Smallwood Road.

References

External links

 Biographic notes at Maryland's Smallwood State Park
  Account of Smallwood's Revolutionary War Campaign and Governorship from J.D. Warfield (1905).
 Stoddert Family papers trace their roots back to General William Smallwood, located at the University of Maryland Libraries 
 The Society of the Cincinnati
 The American Revolution Institute

1732 births
1792 deaths
American slave owners
Continental Army generals
American people of English descent
Continental Army officers from Maryland
Governors of Maryland
People from Charles County, Maryland
People of Maryland in the French and Indian War
Presidents of the Maryland State Senate
Burials in Maryland
People of colonial Maryland